Briody, from Old Irish personal name Ó Bruaideadha, is a surname. Notable people with the surname include:

Fatty Briody (1858–1903), American baseball player
Dan Briody, American journalist and author, active 1999–present

See also
Brody (name)

Surnames of Irish origin